The Brisbane Lions' 2001 season was its fifth season in the Australian Football League (AFL). In it, the club won the first premiership in its history.

Season summary

Home and away season

Finals series

Ladder

References

Brisbane Lions Season, 2001
Brisbane Lions seasons